Grevillea triternata is a shrub of the family Proteaceae native to central and northern New South Wales.

References

triternata
Flora of New South Wales
Proteales of Australia
Taxa named by Robert Brown (botanist, born 1773)